Patania menoni is a moth in the family Crambidae. It was described by Jagbir Singh Kirti and Navneet Singh Gill in 2007. It is found in Arunachal Pradesh, India.

References

Moths described in 2007
Spilomelinae